Wiltshire North and Bath was a United Kingdom European Parliament constituency, electing one member. As a result of a boundary reorganization, it came into being for the European Parliament election of 1994 and ceased to exist in 1999, when the United Kingdom abandoned the first-past-the-post system in single-member constituencies for the European elections in England, Scotland and Wales.

Wiltshire North and Bath consisted of the Westminster Parliament constituencies (on their 1983 boundaries) of Bath, Devizes, North Wiltshire, Swindon, Wansdyke, and Westbury. Its only Member of the European Parliament was Caroline Jackson.

The constituency came to an end in 1999, when the UK adopted a form of proportional representation within much larger regional constituencies, and Wiltshire North and Bath was merged into the new South West England European Parliament constituency.

Members of the European Parliament

Election results

References

External links
 David Boothroyd's United Kingdom Election Results

European Parliament constituencies in England (1979–1999)
Politics of Bath, Somerset
Politics of Wiltshire
Politics of Bath and North East Somerset
1994 establishments in England
1999 disestablishments in England
Constituencies established in 1994
Constituencies disestablished in 1999